The 2015–16 season was Sheffield Wednesday's fourth consecutive season in the Championship. Along with competing in the Championship, the club also participated in the FA Cup and League Cup.

The season covers the period from 1 July 2015 to 30 June 2016.

Overview

Pre-season
Prior to the start of the pre-season schedule the club announced that eleven players had been released after reaching the end of their contracts. Also in June, head coach Stuart Gray was sacked after 18 months in charge. Carlos Carvalhal was announced as Gray's replacement on 30 June 2015.

August
Sheffield Wednesday got their 2015–16 season underway at Hillsborough to Bristol City - a match that The Owls won 2–0 thanks to second half goals from Tom Lees and Lewis McGugan who signed a permanent deal after spending last season on loan at the club. This was followed by a victory in the Capital One Cup - which was also at Hillsborough - with a 4–1 victory over League Two side Mansfield Town. The second league match of the season was a 2–1 away loss to Ipswich Town. This was followed by two consecutive 1–1 draws which were at home to Reading and away to Leeds United respectively. In the next game The Owls progressed into the third round of the Capital One Cup with a 1–0 win over Oxford United. This was followed by the first home defeat of the season with a 3–1 loss to Middlesbrough.

September
The Owls lost their first game of September in a 3–1 defeat to Burnley at Turf Moor. This was followed by a goalless draw at the Macron Stadium against lowly Bolton Wanderers and The Owls' second league victory of the season - a 3–2 win against Fulham at Hillsborough, in which star signing Fernando Forestieri scored his first goal since moving from Watford, a simple close range finish on 5 minutes. A few days later Sheffield Wednesday progressed into the fourth round of the Capital One Cup with a 1–0 win against Newcastle United with Lewis McGugan scoring the game's only goal in a shock result. The Owls' last game of September was a 2–1 away win at Brentford thanks to an Atdhe Nuhiu penalty and a late winner from Lucas João.

October
The Owls got October off to a winning start with a 3–1 win against Preston North End at Hillsborough. This was followed by two consecutive draws - 1–1 against Hull City at Hillsborough and 0–0 away to Queens Park Rangers. The following game saw Sheffield Wednesday win 2–1 against local rivals Rotherham United at the New York Stadium thanks to a goal each from Fernando Forestieri and Lucas João respectively. The Owls' next game was a 3–0 victory over Premier League side Arsenal in the Capital One Cup at Hillsborough. To end the month The Owls won 1–0 at home against Nottingham Forest - thus completing the month unbeaten.

November
Wednesday started the month with a goalless draw with unbeaten in the league Brighton followed by a surprise 3–1 defeat against Charlton. After an international break Wednesday beat local rivals Huddersfield Town 3–1 with Kieran Lee scoring along with a Lucas João brace after Sean Scannell's opener for the Terriers. This result was followed by a 2–2 draw away at Blackburn - with Modou Sougou and Lucas João scoring for The Owls.

December
Two successive draws followed for The Wednesday - the first being 0–0 at home to Derby County. This was followed by a 2–2 draw away to Cardiff City - with a Fernando Forestieri goal and Barry Bannan's first goal for the club rescuing a point for The Owls. A 2–1 loss away at Milton Keynes Dons, in which Gary Hoopers consolation was his first for the club, was followed by a 4–1 thrashing of Wolverhampton Wanderers at Hillsborough - with a Fernando Forestieri brace and a goal each from Daniel Pudil and Gary Hooper earning all three points for The Owls. Sheffield Wednesday's last home match of 2015 saw them win 3–0 against Birmingham City - with another Fernando Forestieri brace and a goal from Kieran Lee securing the win. A 1–0 loss away to Middlesbrough was Sheffield Wednesday's last game of 2015 - ending the year in 7th place in the league table. A rotated side conceded after just 44 seconds to Christian Stuani, in a poor performance.

January
A Ross Wallace goal was enough for The Owls to get off to a winning start in 2016 with a 1–0 win at Craven Cottage against Fulham. They played the Londoners again the week after, winning again (2–1) making three wins over Fulham this campaign. Atdhe Nuhiu and Barry Bannan scored. Two successive wins followed against Bolton Wanderers (3–2) and Leeds United (2–0) - both at Hillsborough. Gary Hooper made his move to Hillsborough permanent in mid January from Norwich for a rumoured £3,000,000. Joe Bennett also joined on loan. Following those matches a 1–1 draw away to Reading saw The Owls end January unbeaten in the Championship. A 3–2 defeat away to Shrewsbury Town saw Sheffield Wednesday exit the FA Cup in the 4th Round. Rhoys Wiggins and Sergiu Bus departed on deadline day to Bournemouth (£200,000) and US Salernitana (loan) respectively. Irish midfielder Aiden McGeady joined on loan from Everton.

February
February's first league match saw The Owls maintain their unbeaten run in the Championship with a 1–1 draw at home to Burnley - with Kieran Lee getting the equalising goal to earn a point for Sheffield Wednesday. The second match of the month was away at Birmingham, in which The Owls won 2–1, courtesy of two late Gary Hooper goals. This left them in the play-off positions. Next week they played Brentford, a 4–0 win ensued after an early red card to Yohan Barbet. A super goal by Gary Hooper was the pick of the bunch. At Deepdale, Sheffield Wednesday lost ground on the Automatic Promotion places with a 1–0 turnover to Preston North End. Joe Garner scored after Fernando Forestieri's second yellow card saw him sent off. On the following Tuesday, Atdhe Nuhiu scored a header and missed a penalty in a home draw to Queens Park Rangers. Daniel Toszer scored for the visitors. The final game of the month saw The Owls draw 0–0 away to Hull City.

March
The Owls got March off to a losing start by losing 1–0 at home to Rotherham United. A midweek 0–0 draw away to Brighton & Hove Albion was followed by a 3–0 win away to Nottingham Forest - keeping The Owls in the promotion play-off places. The following week saw the owls take on Charlton Athletic at home; they won the game 3–0 with all goals being scored in the second half. The month ended with The Owls 6th in the table - three points clear of Cardiff City.

April
The Owls won their first two games in April - with a 1–0 away win at Huddersfield and 2–1 home win against Blackburn Rovers. This was followed by a 4–1 loss at Bristol City and three consecutive draws against Ipswich Town and Milton Keynes Dons at home and Derby County away. A 3–0 victory over Cardiff City in the final home game of the season secured a promotion play-offs place for The Owls - with a brace from Gary Hooper (his first goals since the 3–0 victory over Nottingham Forest in March) and an own goal from Lee Peltier enough to secure all three points and sixth place for The Owls.

May
The result between Brighton and Derby on 2 May 2016 meant that Wednesday could not finish any higher than 6th on their final league game of the season against Wolverhampton Wanderers. The Owls' finished their league campaign with a 2–1 loss at The Molineux.

After a 3–1 aggregate victory over third placed Brighton and Hove Albion in the play-off semi final, The Wednesday were the first team to book their place in the play-off final at Wembley Stadium - a match that would mark Sheffield Wednesday's first appearance at the stadium since it was rebuilt. At the match though, Wednesday lost 1–0 to Hull City in front of over 41,000 Owls fans; a Mohamed Diamé goal winning the game for The Tigers, denying The Owls a first season in the top flight for 16 years.

Players

Transfers in

Transfers out

Loans in

Loans out

New contracts

International call ups

Pre-season friendlies
On 18 June 2015, Sheffield Wednesday announced their pre-season schedule.

Competitions

Championship

League table

Results Summary

Results by Round

Matches
On 17 June 2015, the fixtures for the forthcoming season were announced.

League Cup
On 16 June 2015, the first round draw was made, Sheffield Wednesday were drawn at home against Mansfield Town. Following this The Owls were later drawn at home against Oxford United, away against Newcastle United, home against Arsenal and away against Stoke City.

FA Cup
Sheffield Wednesday competed in the FA Cup from the third round. After a 2–1 victory over Fulham at home The Owls were drawn away against Shrewsbury Town - a match that the Wednesday lost 3–2 after 95th minute winning goal.

Football League play-offs
As a result of The Owls finishing in sixth place in the Championship they qualified for the Football League play-offs. In the play-off semi finals Sheffield Wednesday played against third placed team Brighton and Hove Albion - winning 3–1 on aggregate to reach the play-off final. In the final, Wednesday lost 1–0 to Hull City who went straight back up to the Premier League after being relegated the previous season.

Squad statistics

Appearances

|-
|colspan="12" style="text-align:center;" |Out on loan
|-

|-
|colspan="12" style="text-align:center;" |Players no longer at the club
|-

|}

Goalscorers
Includes all competitive matches.

Disciplinary record

Awards

Player of the Month
Player of the Month awards for the 2015–16 season.

Player of the Season
The Player of the Season award was announced on 18 May 2016.

Other awards
 PFA Fans' Player of the Month (September): Ross Wallace
 PFA Fans' Player of the Month (October): Fernando Forestieri
 PFA Fans' Player of the Month (April): Fernando Forestieri
 PFA Championship Team of the Year: Barry Bannan
 Owls Foundation Player of the Year: Fernando Forestieri

References

Sheffield Wednesday
Sheffield Wednesday F.C. seasons